Zhang Lin (born 6 March 1983 in Fuxin, Liaoning) is a male Chinese rower, who competed for Team China at the 2008 Summer Olympics.

Major performances
2005 National Games – 1st lightweight fours;
2006/2007 World Championships – 1st/5th lightweight fours;
2007 World Cup Leg 1/2 – 1st lightweight fours;
2008 World Cup Leg 1 – 1st lightweight fours

References

1983 births
Living people
Olympic rowers of China
People from Fuxin
Rowers at the 2008 Summer Olympics
Rowers from Liaoning
Chinese male rowers
World Rowing Championships medalists for China